Diogo Rocha (born 14 June 1984) is a Portuguese former professional tennis player who competed in the ITF Men's Circuit. He achieved his highest singles ranking of 634 in the world by the Association of Tennis Professionals (ATP) in February 2005. Though he never entered a singles event in the ATP Challenger Tour, Rocha did play in the 2003, 2004 and 2005 Estoril Open, and was selected for one Davis Cup tie in 2005.

Head-to-head vs. Top 20 players
This section contains Rocha's win-loss record against players who have been ranked 20th or higher in the world rankings during their careers.

National participation

Davis Cup (1 win, 0 losses)
Rocha played 1 match in 1 tie for the Portugal Davis Cup team in 2005. His singles record was 1–0 and his doubles record was 0–0 (1–0 overall).

   indicates the result of the Davis Cup match followed by the score, date, place of event, the zonal classification and its phase, and the court surface.

See also

Portugal Davis Cup team

References

External links

1984 births
Living people
Portuguese male tennis players
Sportspeople from Porto
21st-century Portuguese people